The European Secretariat was a secretariat in the United Kingdom Cabinet Office.

See also
 Defence and Overseas Secretariat
 Economic and Domestic Affairs Secretariat
 Civil Contingencies Secretariat

References

External links

Cabinet Office (United Kingdom)